Higbee may refer to:

Higbee, Missouri, a city in Randolph County, Missouri, in the United States
Higbee's, a former Cleveland, Ohio, department store
, a United States Navy destroyer in commission from 1945 to 1979

People with the surname
Chauncey L. Higbee (1821–1884), early member of the Latter Day Saints Movement
Edward Young Higbee (1810–1871), Episcopal clergyman
Elias Higbee (1795–1843), historian and recorder in the Church of Jesus Christ of Latter Day Saints
Ethan Higbee, American filmmaker
Francis M. Higbee (1820-1856), early member of the Latter Day Saints Movement
Lenah Higbee (1874–1941), pioneering nurse in the United States Navy 
Mahlon Higbee (1901–1968), American baseball catcher
Shawn Higbee (born 1970), professional motorcycle racer
Tyler Higbee (born 1993), American football tight end